Self-rescue, in climbing, or in the broader activity of mountaineering, refers to actions and techniques, taken by either an individual climber or teams, to retreat or advance from situations which would leave them, otherwise unprepared, stranded (and, possibly, dead).

Self-rescue is an alternative to calling search and rescue (SAR) which can save the climber(s) being charged for SAR services and can avoid putting SAR team members in harm's way.  Unfortunately, many aspiring climbers don't take the opportunity to train themselves in real-life conditions (overhanging edges, etc.) and "find they need to seek outside help".

When members of a team require self-rescue, rescuing a fallen partner may expose the rescuer to significant risks. Self-rescue requires having a practiced rescue plan, good communication, and foresight to avoid "an incident within an incident".

Reasons for self-rescue
Self-rescue techniques can be used to pass a difficult section or to rappel down a multiple-pitch route with an injured climber.

Techniques 
Techniques employed during self-rescue include:
Tandem rappels
Counterbalance Rappels
Rescue Spiders
Rope Soloing
Multidirectional Anchors
Belay Escapes
Rescue Knots
Ascending Methods

See also
Glossary of climbing terms
Glossary of knots common in climbing
List of climbing topics
Mountain rescue

References

Further reading
 David Fasulo, Self-Rescue: How to Rock Climb Series. 
 The Mountaineers Books, Mountaineering: The Freedom of the Hills_. 8th Ed. 
 Andy Tyson, Molly Loomis. Climbing Self Rescue: Improvising Solutions for Serious Situations. 

Climbing techniques